Paris College of Art, is an international college of art and design with U.S degree-granting authority and accreditation from the National Association of Schools of Art and Design (NASAD) located in Paris, France. PCA's mission is to provide the highest standard of art and design education, taught within an American pedagogical paradigm, while being influenced and informed by their French and European environment.

History
In 1981, the school was established as a French Association (type 1901) under the name “École Parsons à Paris”. Until 2010, the school had a relationship with Parsons School of Design, and was known as "Parsons Paris". Its association with Parsons ended in 2010, and it became an independent institution and changed its name to Paris College of Art. PCA has 300 students and 100 faculty members from more than 50 different countries.

Education 

PCA has accreditation from the United States National Association of Schools of Art and Design (NASAD) and is part of the International Association of Universities and Colleges of Art, Design and Media (CUMULUS). It is also recognized by the Rectorat de Paris as an establishment of higher education. Its partnerships include agreements and research with the Centre de Recherche du Château de Versailles, Pantheon-Sorbonne University, the Centre Georges Pompidou, Les Arts Décoratifs, and La Maison Lesage. Degree courses are taught in English.

Paris College of Art offers the following programs:

Undergraduate degree programs 
 Undergraduate Core: Foundation Year
 Undergraduate Core: Liberal Studies

Bachelor of Fine Arts 
 Fine Arts 
 Interior Design 
 Photography 
 Communication Design 
 Fashion Design

Bachelor of Arts (B.A.) 
 Design Management

Graduate degree programs 

Master of Arts (MA) in Accessories Design
Master of Arts (MA) in Fashion Design | Haute Couture-Haute Technology
Master of Arts (MA) in Fashion Film & Photography
Master of Arts (MA) in Design for Social Impact
Master of Arts (MA) and Master of Fine Arts in Transdisciplinary New Media
Master of Arts (MA) and Master of Fine Arts in Photography and Image-Making
Master of Arts (MA) and Master of Fine Arts in Interior Design
Master of Arts (MA) and Master of Fine Arts in Drawing

Study abroad programs

Center for University Programs Abroad (CUPA) 
Focusing on direct matriculation, CUPA provides a study-abroad experience in Paris to students from US colleges and universities.

PCA Study Abroad 
A study abroad option for college juniors and seniors in an intensive semester or year-long program.

PCA Summer 
PCA offers summer courses in art, art history, design, culture, and language city of Paris. Levels include pre-college, college, and adult options. Students are encouraged to draw on Paris' cultural heritage for inspiration, and are often taken on trips around the city during classes.
 Art History
 Fashion Design
 Fine Arts
 Interior Design
 Photography

Non-degree programs 
 Certificate Programs: an intensive one-year curriculum focused on a specific discipline, this program is aimed at mature students wishing to change career, refine a design portfolio, or prepare for entering a Master's degree program.

Cultural partnerships 
Paris College of Art has partnerships with cultural institutions in Paris and overseas, giving their students access to prestigious research facilities and offering them guidance in the artistic, entrepreneurial, design and cultural field.
 Pantheon Sorbonne University
 Les Arts Décoratifs Library
 Terra Foundation for American Art
 The American Library in Paris
 La Gaîté Lyrique
 La Réserve des Arts
 Château de Versailles Research Center
 Kandinski Library at Centre George Pompidou
 NUMA
 PUBLIC Journal

Notable alumni

Many of the following are Parsons alumni.

Natalia Fedner, fashion designer
Erin Fetherston, fashion designer
Tom Ford, fashion designer, film director and producer
Bennu Gerede, actress, model
Georgia Hardinge, fashion designer
Calla Haynes Calla), fashion designer
Lazaro Hernandez (Proenza Schouler), fashion designer
Nicky Hoberman, artist, painter
Ryan Mendoza, artist
David Peck (Miles David), fashion designer
Julia Restoin Roitfield, model, consultant and freelance graphic designer
Patrick Robinson, fashion designer
Margot Warre (MARGOT), fashion designer

See also
Parsons Paris

References

External links 

Art schools in Paris
Private universities and colleges in Europe
1986 establishments in France
Educational institutions established in 1986
Parsons School of Design